Saint-Riquier is a commune in the Somme department in Hauts-de-France in northern France.

Geography

Abbey
Saint-Riquier (originally Centula or Centulum) gained fame for its abbey, founded about 625 by Riquier (Richarius), son of the governor of the town, when the town was within Austrasia in the Merovingian Kingdom. It was enriched by King Dagobert I and prospered in the early 9th century Carolingian Empire under the abbacy of Angilbert, son-in-law of Charlemagne. In the year 881 Northmen burned the abbey and destroyed much of what was Centula.

The monastery was rebuilt in the Middle Ages on a smaller scale. The abbey was part of the diocese of Amiens in Ponthieu. The early counts of Ponthieu originally were styled advocatus of the abbey of Saint Riquier and "castellan" of Abbeville. The counts of Ponthieu enrolled their younger sons who were going into religious vocations at the abbey. Count Enguerrand I placed his sons, Fulk, later abbot of Forest-l'Abbaye, and Guy, later the bishop of Amiens, in Saint Riquier for their education. Their teacher was abbot Enguerrand "the Wise" (d. 9 December 1045), under whose rule Saint Riquier enjoyed its "golden age." The abbey held estates in Norfolk, England.

Today's 18th century buildings are occupied by an ecclesiastical seminary. The present church, built in the 13th and 14th centuries, is a magnificent example of Flamboyant Gothic architecture, and has a richly sculptured front on the west, surmounted by a square tower. In the interior the fine vaulting, the Renaissance font and carved stalls, and the frescoes in the treasury are especially noteworthy. Among other valuable relics, the treasury possesses a copper cross said to be the work of Saint Eloi (Eligius).

In 1536 Saint-Riquier repulsed an attack by the Germans, during its defense the women especially distinguishing themselves. In 1544 it was burned by the English, an event that marks the beginning of its decline.

Other sites
The bell-tower of Saint-Riquier was inscribed on the UNESCO World Heritage List in 2005 because of its architecture and testimony to the rise of municipal power in the area during the late Middle Ages, Renaissance, and Baroque periods.

Population

Twin towns
  : Stutensee-Friedrichstal, Germany, since 1982.

See also
Communes of the Somme department

References
 The Carmen de Hastingae Proelio of Guy Bishop of Amiens, edited by Catherine Morton and Hope Muntz, Oxford at the Clarendon Press, 1972.
 The Carmen de Hastingae Proelio of Guy Bishop of Amiens, edited and translated by Frank Barlow, Clarendon Press, Oxford, 1999.
 'Encyclopædia Britannica'' Eleventh Edition, 1911.
The Carolingian Renaissance, Hubert, Porcher, and Volbach, Braziller, New York, 1970.

External links

 Official town website
 Website of the Office de tourisme of Saint-Riquier

Communes of Somme (department)